This is a list of notable converts to Christianity who were not theists before their conversion. All names should be sourced and the source should indicate they had not been a theist, not merely non-churchgoing, before conversion.

Converted to Anglicanism or Episcopalianism 
Joy Davidman – poet and wife of C. S. Lewis
Tamsin Greig – British actress raised as an atheist; converted at 30
Nicky Gumbel – Anglican priest known for the Alpha course; from atheism
Peter Hitchens – journalist who went from Trotskyism to Traditionalist conservatism; brother of the anti-theist and Vanity Fair writer Christopher Hitchens
C. E. M. Joad – English philosopher whose arguing against Christianity, from an agnostic perspective, earned him criticism from T. S. Eliot; turned toward religion later, writing The Recovery of Belief a year before he died and returning to Christianity
 C. S. Lewis – Oxford professor and writer; well known for The Chronicles of Narnia series, and for his apologetic Mere Christianity
 Alister McGrath – biochemist and Christian theologian' founder of "scientific theology" and critic of Richard Dawkins in his book Dawkins' God: Genes, Memes, and the Meaning of Life
Enoch Powell – Conservative Party (UK) member who converted to Anglicanism
Michael Reiss – British bioethicist, educator, journalist, and Anglican priest; agnostic/secular upbringing
Dame Cicely Saunders – Templeton Prize and Conrad N. Hilton Humanitarian Prize-winning nurse known for palliative care; converted to Christianity as a young woman
Fay Weldon – British novelist and feminist

Converted to Catholicism 
Mortimer J. Adler – American philosopher, educator, and popular author; converted to Catholicism from agnosticism, after decades of interest in Thomism 
G. E. M. Anscombe – analytic philosopher, Thomist, literary executor for Ludwig Wittgenstein, and author of Modern Moral Philosophy; converted to Catholicism as a result of her extensive reading
Benedict Ashley – raised humanist; former Communist; became a noted theologian associated with River Forest Thomism
Maurice Baring – English author who converted in his thirties
Mark Bauerlein –  English professor at Emory University and the author of 2008 book The Dumbest Generation, which won at the Nautilus Book Awards
Léon Bloy – French author who led to several notable conversions and was himself a convert from agnosticism
Paul Bourget – French author who became agnostic and positivist at 15, but returned to Catholicism at 35
 Alexis Carrel – French surgeon and biologist who was awarded the Nobel Prize in Physiology or Medicine in 1912
 Salvador Dalí, Spanish painter, raised atheist by his father but later converted to Catholicism 
 Alfred Döblin, German novelist, essayist and doctor, a former convert from Judaism to atheism
Avery Dulles – Jesuit priest, theologian, and cardinal in the Catholic Church; was raised Presbyterian, but was an agnostic before his conversion to Catholic Christianity
Alice Thomas Ellis – born Anna Haycraft, raised in Auguste Comte's atheistic "church of humanity", but became a conservative Catholic in adulthood known as Alice Thomas Ellis
Edward Feser – Christian philosopher and author, wrote The Last Superstition: A Refutation of the New Atheism
André Frossard – French journalist and essayist
Maggie Gallagher – conservative activist and a founder of the National Organization for Marriage
Eugene D. Genovese – historian who went from Stalinist to Catholicism
Dawn Eden Goldstein – rock journalist of Jewish ethnicity; went from an agnostic to a Catholic, who was particularly concerned with the moral values of chastity
Bill Hayden – The 21st Governor-General of Australia. In 1996 he was recognised as the Australian Humanist of the Year by the Council of Australian Humanist Societies. Baptized September 2018. 
Mary Karr – author of The Liars' Club; Guggenheim Fellow; once described herself as an "undiluted agnostic", but converted to a self-acknowledged "Cafeteria Catholicism" who embraces Pro-Choice views, amongst others
Ignace Lepp – French psychiatrist whose parents were freethinkers and who joined the Communist party at age fifteen; broke with the party in 1937 and eventually became a Catholic priest
Leah Libresco – popular (former) atheist blogger; her search for a foundation for her sense of morality led her to Christianity; she continues her blog under a new name, Unequally Yoked. Her blog readership has increased significantly since her conversion.
Arnold Lunn – skier, mountaineer, and writer; as an agnostic he wrote Roman Converts, which took a critical view of Catholicism and the converts to it; later converted to Catholicism due to debating with converts, and became an apologist for the faith, although he retained a few criticisms of it
Gabriel Marcel – leading Christian existentialist; his upbringing was agnostic
Claude McKay – bisexual Jamaican poet who went from Communist-leaning atheist to an active Catholic Christian after a stroke
Vittorio Messori – Italian journalist and writer called the "most translated Catholic writer in the world" by Sandro Magister; before his conversion in 1964 he had a "perspective as a secularist and agnostic" 
 Czesław Miłosz – poet, prose writer, translator and diplomat; was awarded the Neustadt International Prize for Literature, and in 1980 the Nobel Prize in Literature
Malcolm Muggeridge – British journalist and author who went from agnosticism to the Catholic Church
Bernard Nathanson – medical doctor who was a founding member of NARAL, later becoming an anti-abortion activist
Fulton Oursler – writer who was raised Baptist, but spent decades as an agnostic before converting; The Greatest Story Ever Told is based on one of his works
Giovanni Papini – went from pragmatic atheism to Catholicism, also a fascist
Joseph Pearce – anti-Catholic and agnostic British National Front member who became a devoted Catholic writer with a series on EWTN
Charles Péguy – French poet, essayist, and editor; went from agnostic humanist to a pro-Republic Catholic
Sally Read – Eric Gregory Award-winning poet who converted to Catholicism
E. F. Schumacher – economic thinker known for Small Is Beautiful; his A Guide for the Perplexed criticizes what he termed "materialistic scientism;" went from atheism to Buddhism to Catholicism
Peter Steele – lead singer of Type O Negative
Edith Stein – Phenomenologist philosopher who converted to Catholicism and became a Discalced Carmelite nun; declared a saint by John Paul II
John Lawson Stoddard – divinity student who became an agnostic and "scientific humanist;" later he converted to Catholicism; his son Lothrop Stoddard remained agnostic and would be significant to scientific racism
R. J. Stove – raised atheist, converted to Catholicism
Allen Tate – American poet, essayist and social commentator; Poet Laureate Consultant in Poetry to the Library of Congress
Victor Turner – A British cultural anthropologist best known for his work on symbols, rituals and rites of passage.
Sigrid Undset – Norwegian Nobel laureate who converted to Catholicism from agnosticism
J. D. Vance – The writer of Hillbilly Elegy.
Evelyn Waugh – British novelist who converted to Catholicism from agnosticism
John C. Wright – science fiction author who went from atheist to Catholic; Chapter 1 of the book "Atheist to Catholic: 11 Stories of Conversion", edited by Rebecca Vitz Cherico, is by him

Converted to Eastern Orthodox Christianity 
Emir Kusturica – filmmaker, actor, and musician; although of Muslim ancestry, his father was atheist; took the name "Nemanja" on conversion in 2005
Seraphim Rose – Hieromonk and religious writer; in early adulthood he considered non-theist ideas of God and the Philosophy of Friedrich Nietzsche that God is dead; became Russian Orthodox in 1962
Aleksandr Solzhenitsyn – Nobel Prize-winning dissident author who converted to Russian Orthodoxy

Converted to Protestantism 
Steve Beren – former member of the U.S. Socialist Workers Party who became a Christian conservative politician
Kirk Cameron – actor noted for his role in Growing Pains 
Francis Collins – physician-geneticist, noted for his landmark discoveries of disease genes; director of the National Human Genome Research Institute; former atheist
Bo Giertz – Swedish Confessional Lutheran Bishop, theologian, and writer
Simon Greenleaf – one of the main founders of Harvard Law School
Keir Hardie – raised atheist and became a Christian Socialist
Paul Jones – musician, of Manfred Mann; previously atheist; in 1967 he argued with Cliff Richard about religion on a TV show
Kang Kek Iew (also known as Comrade Duch) – Cambodian director of Phnom Penh's infamous Tuol Sleng detention center
Akiane Kramarik (and family) – American poet and child prodigy
Jonny Lang – blues and rock singer who professed to once "hating" Christianity, before later claiming to have a supernatural encounter with Jesus Christ which led to his conversion
Chai Ling – Chinese student leader of the Tiananmen Square protests of 1989; converted to evangelical Christianity in 2009
John Warwick Montgomery – renowned Christian apologist, Lutheran theologian, and barrister; as a philosophy major in college, he investigated the claims of Christianity "to preserve intellectual integrity" and converted
William J. Murray  – author and son of atheist activist Madalyn Murray O'Hair
Marvin Olasky – former Marxist turned Christian conservative; edits the Christian World magazine
George R. Price – geneticist who became an Evangelical Christian and wrote about the New Testament; later he began to engage less in evangelism and switched from religious writing to working with the homeless
Mira Sorvino – Academy Award-winning actress who had been on secular humanist lists
Lee Strobel – former avowed atheist and journalist for the Chicago Tribune; was converted by his own journalistic research intended to test the veracity of scriptural claims concerning Jesus; author of such apologetic books as The Case for Faith and The Case for Christ
Lacey Sturm – musician, former vocalist and lyricist for alternative metal band Flyleaf

Converts to the Quaker faith 
Whittaker Chambers – former Communist turned conservative writer
Gerald Priestland – news correspondent who discusses having once been the "school atheist" in Something Understood: An Autobiography; became a Quaker after an emotional breakdown

Unspecified or other 
Peter Baltes – former heavy metal musician, member of Accept
Anders Borg  – Sweden's former Minister for Finance
Julie Burchill – British journalist and feminist
Nicole Cliffe – writer and journalist who co-founded The Toast
Bruce Cockburn – Canadian folk/rock guitarist and singer/songwriter (former agnostic)
Karl Dallas – British music journalist, author and political activist
Larry Darby – former Holocaust denier and former member of the American Atheists
Terry A. Davis – American computer programmer who created and designed an entire operating system, TempleOS, by himself.  Davis grew up Catholic and was an atheist before experiencing a self-described "revelation". He described the experience as seeming "a lot like mental illness ... I felt guilty for being such a technology-advocate atheist ... It would sound polite if you said I scared myself thinking about quantum computers."
Andrew Klavan – Jewish-American writer who went from atheist to agnostic to Christian.
Nina Karin Monsen – Norwegian moral philosopher and author who grew up in a humanist family, but later converted to Christianity through philosophic thinking
Rosalind Picard – Director of the Affective computing Research Group at the MIT Media Lab; raised atheist, but converted to Christianity in her teens
Allan Sandage – prolific astronomer; converted to Christianity later in his life, stating, "I could not live a life full of cynicism. I chose to believe, and a peace of mind came over me."
Rodney Stark –  a formerly agnostic sociologist of religion.
A. N. Wilson – biographer and novelist who entered the theological St Stephen's House, Oxford before proclaiming himself an atheist and writing against religion; announced his return to Christianity in 2009

Notes

References

 
C